Peake Wood is a  biological Site of Special Scientific Interest west of Petersfield in Hampshire.

This is a prime example of a hazel and ash wood on calcareous soils. There is also a variety of other trees and a rich herb layer, which is dominated by bluebell and dog's mercury. Other plants include the rare star-of-Bethlehem and fly orchid.

The site is private land with no public access.

References

 
Sites of Special Scientific Interest in Hampshire